Minchumina Airport  is a state-owned public-use airport serving Lake Minchumina, in the Yukon-Koyukuk Census Area of the U.S. state of Alaska. It is also known as Lake Minchumina Airport. In the past, the airport used MHM IATA code.

Scheduled passenger service at this airport is subsidized by the United States Department of Transportation via the Essential Air Service program.

Facilities and aircraft 
It has one runway designated 3/21 with a gravel surface measuring 4,200 by 100 feet (1,280 x 30 m). For the 12-month period ending December 31, 2005, the airport had 1,140 aircraft operations, an average of 95 per month: 96% general aviation and 4% air taxi.

Airlines and destinations 

The following airline offers scheduled passenger service:

Statistics

References

Other sources 

 Essential Air Service documents (Docket DOT-OST-2008-0237) from the U.S. Department of Transportation:
 Ninety-Day Notice (July 29, 2008: of Tatonduk Outfitters Limited d/b/a Everts Air Alaska intent to terminate subsidy-free air service between Fairbanks, and Lake Minchumina, Alaska.
 Order 2008-8-3 (August 6, 2008): prohibiting Tatonduk Outfitters, Ltd., d/b/a Everts Air Alaska, from suspending service at Lake Minchumina, Alaska, and requesting proposals by August 22 from carriers interested in providing replacement essential air service (EAS).
 Order 2008-9-21 (September 16, 2008): Selecting Tatonduk Outfitters, Ltd. d/b/a Everts Air Cargo, to provide subsidized essential air service at Lake Minchumina, Alaska, for the two-year period from October 27, 2008, through October 31, 2010, at an annual rate of $42,560.
 Order 2010-7-14 (July 16, 2010): selecting Warbelow's Air Ventures, Inc., to provide essential air service (EAS) at Lake Minchumina, Alaska, at an annual subsidy rate of $62,400. The selection extends from November 1, 2010, through October 31, 2012.
 Order 2010-7-20 (July 27, 2010): grants Lake Minchumina's Petition for Reconsideration of Order 2010-7-14 and rescinds Order 2010-7-14 selecting Warbelow's Air Ventures, Inc. On reconsideration, we select Wright Air Service, Inc., Option 2, for $93,080 annual subsidy, to provide essential air service (EAS) to Lake Minchumina, Alaska.
 Memorandum (August 3, 2010): The startup date for Wright Air Service in Order 2010-7-20 should be November 1, 2010, not October 1, 2010. Wright's contract will run for two years, through October 31, 2012.
 Order 2012-10-14 (October 11, 2012): re-selecting Wright Air Service, Inc., to provide Essential Air Service (EAS) at Lake Minchumina, Alaska, for $102,300 annually for two nonstop round trips per week to Fairbanks – one with a 9-seat IFR Certified aircraft (Cessna 208 or Piper Navajo) and one with 4-seat single-engine piston aircraft (Cessna 206 or Beech Bonanza) – through October 31, 2014.

External links 
 Alaska FAA airport diagram (GIF)
 

Airports in the Yukon–Koyukuk Census Area, Alaska
Essential Air Service